Muzzey may refer to:

People with the surname
David P. Muzzey (1838–1910), American lawyer.
David Saville Muzzey (1870-1965), American historian.
Kerry Muzzey (born 1970), American classical and film and television composer.